Băbeni is a commune located in Sălaj County, Transylvania, Romania. It is composed of five villages: Băbeni, Ciocmani (Csokmány), Cliț (Csűrfalva), Piroșa (Pirosd) and Poienița (Kismező).

Sights 
 Wooden Church in Piroșa (built in the 19th century), historic monument
 Wooden Church in Poienița (built in the 19th century), historic monument
 Nature reserve Stanii Clițului of Cliț (16 ha)

References

Communes in Sălaj County
Localities in Transylvania